Joey Brock (born 20 September 1988 in Arnhem) is a Dutch professional footballer who plays as a leftback. He currently plays for Dutch amateur side Veluwezoom Velp.

Club career
Brock played for NEC and RBC Roosendaal, before moving to FC Den Bosch in 2011.

He joined Helmond Sport as an amateur in 2013 after he was released by Den Bosch, who were looking to offload him after dressing room spats with teammates. In 2016 Brock moved to TEC from fellow amateurs Duno Doorwerth, whom he had joined in February 2015.

After two and a half years without club, Brock returned to the pitch when he joined Dutch amateur club, Veluwezoom Velp, in January 2020.

References

External links
 Voetbal International profile 

1988 births
Living people
Footballers from Arnhem
Association football fullbacks
Dutch footballers
SBV Vitesse players
NEC Nijmegen players
RBC Roosendaal players
FC Den Bosch players
SV TEC players
Helmond Sport players
VV DUNO players
Eredivisie players
Eerste Divisie players
21st-century Dutch people